Setoeolis inconspicua is a species of sea slug, specifically an aeolid nudibranch. It is a marine gastropod mollusc in the family Facelinidae. It is the only species in the genus Setoeolis as identified by Baba & Hamatani, 1965.

Distribution
The holotype of this species was found at Seto, Kii Province, Japan. It has been found at sites including Wakasa Bay on the Echizen coast and the Izu Peninsula.

References

Facelinidae
Gastropods described in 1938